Dungannon was a United Kingdom Parliament constituency, in Ireland, returning one MP. It was an original constituency represented in Parliament when the Union of Great Britain and Ireland took effect on 1 January 1801.

Boundaries
This constituency was the parliamentary borough of Dungannon in County Tyrone.

Members of Parliament

Elections

Elections in the 1830s

Knox resigned, causing a by-election.

Knox resigned, causing a by-election.

Elections in the 1840s

Elections in the 1850s
Knox resigned due to ill health by accepting the office of Steward of the Chiltern Hundreds, causing a by-election.

Knox resigned again by accepting the office of Steward of the Chiltern Hundreds, causing a by-election.

Knox was appointed a Groom in Waiting to Queen Victoria, causing a by-election.

Elections in the 1860s

Elections in the 1870s

Elections in the 1880s

On petition, Dickson was unseated and a by-election was called.

Notes

References
The Parliaments of England by Henry Stooks Smith (1st edition published in three volumes 1844–50), 2nd edition edited (in one volume) by F.W.S. Craig (Political Reference Publications 1973)

Westminster constituencies in County Tyrone (historic)
Constituencies of the Parliament of the United Kingdom established in 1801
Constituencies of the Parliament of the United Kingdom disestablished in 1885
Dungannon